Jersey competed at the 2018 Commonwealth Games in the Gold Coast, Australia from April 4 to April 15, 2018.

The team from Jersey consisted of 33 athletes competing in eight sports.

Cyclist Daniel Halksworth was the country's flag bearer during the opening ceremony.

Competitors
The following is the list of number of competitors participating at the Games per sport/discipline.

Athletics

Jersey participated with 3 athletes (3 men).

Men
Track & road events

Field events

Badminton

Jersey participated with four athletes (two men and two women)

Singles

Doubles

Cycling

Jersey participated with 6 athletes (4 men and 2 women).

Road
Men

Women

Mountain bike

Gymnastics

Artistic
Jersey participated with 3 athletes (1 man and 2 woman).

Men
Individual Qualification

Individual Finals

Women
Individual Qualification

Individual Finals

Lawn bowls

Jersey is scheduled to compete in the lawn bowls competition.

Men

Women

Shooting

Jersey participated with 6 athletes (4 men and 2 women).

Men

Women

Open

Swimming

Jersey participated with 2 athletes (1 man and 1 woman).

Men

Women

Triathlon

Jersey participated with 1 athlete (1 man).

Individual

References

Nations at the 2018 Commonwealth Games
Jersey at the Commonwealth Games
2018 in Jersey